Uzakbay Karamanuly Karamanov or Uzakbay Karamanovich Karamanov (20 August 1937 – 25 September 2017) was the last premier of the Kazakh Soviet Socialist Republic. He served from 1989 to 1991.

References

1937 births
2017 deaths
People from Kyzylorda Region
Central Committee of the Communist Party of the Soviet Union members
Communist Party of the Soviet Union members
Prime Ministers of Kazakhstan

Recipients of the Order of Parasat
Recipients of the Order of the Red Banner of Labour